Pisieu is a commune in the Isère department in southeastern France.

Population

Twin towns
Pisieu is twinned with:

  Sant Martí de Tous, Spain, since 1996

See also
Communes of the Isère department

References

Communes of Isère
Isère communes articles needing translation from French Wikipedia